Mohoro is a town located on island of Grande Comore in the Comoros.

Populated places in Grande Comore

Mohoro is also code name for Microsoft Software, Desktop as a Service, a service on Microsoft Azure